The Goya Awards are Spain's main national annual film awards, commonly referred to as the Academy Awards of Spain.

The awards were established in 1987, a year after the founding of the Academy of Cinematographic Arts and Sciences, and the first awards ceremony took place on March 16, 1987, at the Teatro Lope de Vega in Madrid. The ceremony continues to take place annually at Centro de Congresos Príncipe Felipe, around the end of January/beginning of February, and awards are given to films produced during the previous year.

The award itself is a small bronze bust of Francisco Goya created by the sculptor José Luis Fernández, although the original sculpture for the first edition of the Goyas was by Miguel Ortiz Berrocal.

History 
To reward the best Spanish films of each year, the Spanish Academy of Motion Pictures and Arts decided to create the Goya Awards. The Goya Awards are Spain's main national film awards, considered by many in Spain, and internationally, to be the Spanish equivalent of the American Academy Awards. The inaugural ceremony took place on March 17, 1987, at the Lope de Vega theatre in Madrid. From the 2nd edition until 1995, the awards were held at the Palacio de Congresos in the Paseo de la Castellana. Then they moved to the similarly named Palacio Municipal de Congresos, also in Madrid. In 2000, the ceremony took place in Barcelona, at the Barcelona Auditorium. In 2003, a large number of film professionals took advantage of the Goya awards ceremony to express their opposition to the Aznar's government support of the U.S. invasion of Iraq. In 2004, the AVT (an association against terrorism in Spain) demonstrated against terrorism and ETA, a paramilitary organization of Basque separatists, in front of the Lope de Vega theatre. In 2005, José Luis Rodríguez Zapatero was the first prime minister in the history of Spain to attend the event. In 2013, the minister of culture and education José Ignacio Wert did not attend, saying he had “other things to do”. Some actors said that this decision reflected the government's lack of respect for their profession and industry. In the 2019 edition, the awards took place in Seville, and in 2020, the ceremony was held in Málaga.

Awards
The awards are currently delivered in 28 categories, excluding the Honorary Goya Award and the International Goya Award, with an increase of up to five nominees per category established for the upcoming 37th edition. There was a maximum of four candidates for each from the 13th Edition (having been three candidates in the first edition, five in the 2nd and 3rd edition and three from the fourth to the twelfth edition) to the 36th edition.

 Best Film
 Best Director
 Best Leading Actor
 Best Leading Actress
 Best Original Screenplay
 Best Adapted Screenplay
 Best New Director
 Best Supporting Actor
 Best Supporting Actress
 Best New Actor
 Best New Actress
 Best Production Supervision
 Best Cinematography
 Best Editing
 Best Original Score
 Best Original Song
 Best Art Direction
 Best Costume Design
 Best Makeup and Hairstyles
 Best Sound
 Best Special Effects
 Best Animated Film
 Best Animated Short Film
 Best Documentary Short Film
 Best Fictional Short Film
 Best European Film
 Best Documentary
 Best Iberoamerican Film
 Honorary Goya Award
 International Goya Award

Award ceremonies
The following is a listing of all Goya Awards ceremonies since 1986.

Trivia

"Big Five" winners and nominees

Winners
The following is a list of films that won the awards for Best Film, Director, Actor, Actress and Screenplay.
¡Ay, Carmela! (1990): Director (Carlos Saura), adapted screenplay (Rafael Azcona and Carlos Saura), Actor (Andrés Pajares) and Actress (Carmen Maura).
Take My Eyes (2003): Director (Icíar Bollaín), original screenplay (Icíar Bollaín), Actor (Luis Tosar) and Actress (Laia Marull).
The Sea Inside (2004): Director (Alejandro Amenábar), original screenplay (Alejandro Amenábar and Mateo Gil), Actor (Javier Bardem) and Actress (Lola Dueñas).

Nominees
Four awards won
Belle Époque (1992): won Film, Director (Fernando Trueba), original screenplay (Rafael Azcona, José Luis García Sánchez and Fernando Trueba) and Actress (Ariadna Gil); lost Actor (Jorge Sanz).
Running Out of Time (1994): won Film, Director (Imanol Uribe), adapted screenplay (Imanol Uribe) and Actor (Carmelo Gómez); lost Actress (Ruth Gabriel).
Lucky Star (1997): won Film, Director (Ricardo Franco), original screenplay (Ricardo Franco and Ángeles González-Sinde) and Actor (Antonio Resines); lost Actress (Maribel Verdú).
Pain and Glory (2019): won Film, Director (Pedro Almodóvar), original screenplay (Pedro Almodóvar) and Actor (Antonio Banderas); lost Actress (Penélope Cruz).
The Beasts (2022): won Film, Director (Rodrigo Sorogoyen), Original Screenplay (Isabel Peña and Rodrigo Sorogoyen), Actor (Denis Ménochet); lost Actress (Marina Foïs).

Three awards won
Blancanieves (2012): won Film, Actress (Maribel Verdú) and original screenplay (Pablo Berger); lost Director (Pablo Berger) and Actor (Daniel Giménez Cacho).

Two awards won
Lovers (1991): won Film and Director (Vicente Aranda); lost original screenplay (Álvaro del Amo, Carlos Pérez Merinero and Vicente Aranda), Actor (Jorge Sanz), Actress (Victoria Abril and Maribel Verdú).
The Girl of Your Dreams (1998): won Film and Actress (Penélope Cruz); lost Director (Fernando Trueba), original screenplay (Rafael Azcona, David Trueba, Carlos López and Miguel Ángel Egea) and Actor (Antonio Resines).

One award won
Pan's Labyrinth (2006): won original screenplay (Guillermo del Toro); lost Film, Director (Guillermo del Toro), Actor (Sergi López) and Actress (Maribel Verdú).
The Skin I Live In (2011): won Actress (Elena Anaya); lost Film, Director (Pedro Almodóvar), original screenplay (Pedro Almodóvar) and Actor (Antonio Banderas).
Magical Girl (2014): won Actress (Bárbara Lennie); lost Film, Director (Carlos Vermut), original screenplay (Carlos Vermut) and Actor (Luis Bermejo)
The Endless Trench (2019): won Actress (Belén Cuesta); lost Film, Director (Aitor Arregi, Jon Garaño and José Mari Goenaga), original screenplay (José Mari Goenaga and Luiso Berdejo) and Actor (Antonio de la Torre)

No award won
Tie Me Up! Tie Me Down! (1990): lost Film, Director (Pedro Almodóvar), original screenplay (Pedro Almodóvar), Actor (Antonio Banderas) and Actress (Victoria Abril).
The Artist and the Model (2012): lost Film, Director (Fernando Trueba), original screenplay (Fernando Trueba and Jean-Claude Carrière), Actor (Jean Rochefort) and Actress (Aida Folch).
The Bride (2015): lost Film, Director (Paula Ortiz), adapted screenplay (Javier García and Paula Ortiz), Actor (Asier Etxeandia) and Actress (Inma Cuesta)

Multiple wins
The following is a list of films with six or more awards.

14 wins
The Sea Inside (2004)

13 wins
¡Ay, Carmela! (1990)

10 wins
Blancanieves (2012)
Marshland (2014)
Giant (2017)

9 winsBelle Époque (1992)Black Bread (2010)A Monster Calls (2016)The Beasts (2022)

8 winsThe Dumbfounded King (1991)Running Out of Time (1994)Nobody Will Speak of Us When We're Dead (1995)The Others (2001)Cell 211 (2009)Witching and Bitching (2013)

7 winsTesis (1996)The Dog in the Manger (1996)The Girl of Your Dreams (1998)All About My Mother (1999)Take My Eyes (2003)Pan's Labyrinth (2006)The Orphanage (2007)Agora (2009)The Realm (2018)Pain and Glory (2019)

6 winsRowing with the Wind (1988)Twisted Obsession (1989)Banderas, the Tyrant (1993)The Day of the Beast (1995)Camino (2008)No Rest for the Wicked (2011)Living Is Easy with Eyes Closed (2013)The Good Boss (2021)

Multiple nominations
The following is a list of films with ten or more nominations.

20 nominationsThe Good Boss (2021)

19 nominationsRunning Out of Time (1994)

18 nominationsThe Girl of Your Dreams (1998)Blancanieves (2012)

17 nominationsBelle Époque (1992)Marshland (2014)While at War (2019)The Beasts (2022)

16 nominationsWomen on the Verge of a Nervous Breakdown (1988)Cell 211 (2009)The Skin I Live In (2011)Unit 7 (2012)El Niño (2014)Pain and Glory (2019)Prison 77 (2022)

15 nominations¡Ay, Carmela! (1990)Tie Me Up! Tie Me Down! (1990)La comunidad (2000)The Others (2001)The Sea Inside (2004)Alatriste (2006)The Blind Sunflowers (2008)The Last Circus (2010)The Endless Trench (2019)

14 nominationsThe Dumbfounded King (1991)The Day of the Beast (1995)All About My Mother (1999)You're the One (2000)Volver (2006)The Orphanage (2007)13 Roses (2007)Black Bread (2010)No Rest for the Wicked (2011)The Impossible (2012)
 Maixabel (2021)

13 nominationsRowing with the Wind (1988)The Grandfather (1998)Butterfly's Tongue (1999)Pan's Labyrinth (2006)Agora (2009)Even the Rain (2010)The Artist and the Model (2012)Giant (2017)The Realm (2018)Adú (2020)

12 nominationsThe Turkish Passion (1994)The Dog in the Manger (1996)Juana the Mad (2001)Eva (2011)The Bride (2015)A Monster Calls (2016)The Bookshop (2017)

11 nominationsEsquilache (1989)The Fencing Master (1992)Canción de cuna (1994)Solas (1999)Sex and Lucía (2001)Don't Tempt Me (2001)Salvador (2006)Just Walking (2008)Blackthorn (2011)La gran familia española (2013)Smoke & Mirrors (2016)The Fury of a Patient Man (2016)Champions (2018)Alcarràs (2022)Lullaby (2022)

10 nominations
 Moon Child (1989)The Sea and the Weather (1989)Nobody Will Speak of Us When We're Dead (1995)Open Your Eyes (1997)Goya in Bordeaux (1999)Obaba (2005)Seven Billiard Tables (2007)Buried (2010)Witching and Bitching'' (2013)

See also 
 List of film awards

References

External links
 Official Premios Goya website
 Official Spanish Cinema Academy website 
Goya Awards on IMDb

 
Awards established in 1987
Francisco Goya
Spanish film awards
International film awards